Dong Jie (born 31 October 1998) is a Chinese swimmer. She competed in the women's 4 × 200 metre freestyle relay event at the 2016 Summer Olympics.

References

External links
 

1998 births
Living people
Olympic swimmers of China
Swimmers at the 2016 Summer Olympics
Swimmers from Jiangsu
Sportspeople from Huai'an
Chinese female freestyle swimmers
Swimmers at the 2020 Summer Olympics
Medalists at the 2020 Summer Olympics
Olympic gold medalists in swimming
Olympic gold medalists for China
21st-century Chinese women
20th-century Chinese women